Michael Binns (24 January 1902 – October 1987) was a Jamaican cricketer. He played in one first-class match for the Jamaican cricket team in 1926/27.

See also
 List of Jamaican representative cricketers

References

External links
 

1902 births
1987 deaths
Jamaican cricketers
Jamaica cricketers
Cricketers from Kingston, Jamaica